It's a Great Life may refer to:

 It's a Great Life (TV series), an American television series
 It's a Great Life (1929 film), a 1929 American comedy film
 It's a Great Life, a 1935 American drama film directed by Edward F. Cline
 It's a Great Life (1943 film), a 1943 American black-and-white film